Éva Viczay de Loós (1602 – 28 July 1651) was a Hungarian noblewoman, the second wife of Baron Pál Esterházy de Galántha, who was the founder of the Zólyom branch of the House of Esterházy. Her brother was Baron Ádám Viczay de Loós.

Family

They married on 1 August 1625 in Sopron, four years after that her husband's first wife, Zsuzsanna Károlyi died. The marriage produced the following children:

 Emenne (1626–1631), died young
 Rebeka (1631 – after 16 June 1647)
 Zsófia (1633 – 20 March 1688), married to Baron György Berényi de Karancsberény (1601–1677) in 1650
 Miklós (1634 – 19 August 1688), Ispán (Count; comes) of Zólyom County, castellan of Buják
 Magdolna (1635–1708)
 Sándor (1636 – 2 April 1681), heir of the Zólyom lordships
 Ilona (1638 – 26 September 1651), died young
 Gábor (d. before 1653)
 Péter (d. before 1653)
 Dániel (d. before 1653)

References

1602 births
1651 deaths
Eva
Hungarian nobility
People from Sopron